Leave 'em Laughing is a 2020 drama short film directed by Chris Cashman and written by Cashman, Carlo Coppo and Christopher Lusti. The film stars Matthew Glave, Pete Gardner and Barrie Chase. It screened at San Diego International Film Festival, The Valley Film Festival, Woods Hole Film Festival and won Best Art Design at Oceanside International Film Festival. The story is set around Dick Shawn's final act at University of California, San Diego.

Plot 
When Dick Shawn's stand up routine takes a not so funny turn, the audience is left to wonder what they just witnessed.

Cast 

Matthew Glave
Pete Gardner
Barrie Chase
Nikki Tyler-Flynn
Jackie Flynn
Mark Christopher Lawrence
Joe Nunez

Production 

The film is based on a Los Angeles Times article written by Carlo Coppo. It circles around Coppo's experience of Dick Shawn's final performance at University of California, San Diego. The film was submitted to Sundance Film Festival and Tribeca Film Festival.

Matthew Glave was cast as Dick Shawn and Pete Gardner portrayed Carlo Coppo.

Release 

The film screened at San Diego International Film Festival, Oceanside International Film Festival, The Valley Film Festival, Coronado Island Film Festival, Woods Hole Film Festival, SENE Film, Music & Arts Festival and Austin Indie Fest.

Reception

Critical response

Alan Ng of Film Threat scored the film 7.5 out of 10 claiming the "final act is why you want to see" the film.

Accolades

References

External links 

 
 

2020 short films
American drama short films
2020 biographical drama films
Biographical films about actors
Films about comedians
Films shot in San Diego
Films set in San Diego
American biographical drama films
Films based on biographies
2020s English-language films
2020s American films
Films based on newspaper and magazine articles
American films based on actual events
Comedy-drama films based on actual events